Siaosi ‘Ofakivahafolau Sovaleni (born 28 February 1970) styled Hon. Hu'akavameiliku is a Tongan politician who has served as the Prime Minister of Tonga since 2021. He has previously served as a  Cabinet Minister, and from 2014 to 2017, he was Deputy Prime Minister of Tonga. He is the current estate holder of the village of Ha'asini.

Early life
Sovaleni is from Ngele'ia on Tonga's main island Tongatapu and is the son of former Deputy Prime Minister Langi Kavaliku. He attended Timaru Boys' High School in New Zealand and graduated in 1988. He was educated at the University of Auckland in New Zealand, graduating with a Bachelor of Science in computer science in 1992. He subsequently completed a master's degree at the University of Oxford, and an MBA at the University of the South Pacific in Suva, Fiji. He worked as a public servant for Tonga's Ministry of Finance from 1996 to 2010, before working for the Pacific Community and Asian Development Bank. He returned to Tonga in 2013 to work as the Chief Executive in the Ministry of Public Enterprises.

Political career
Sovaleni was first elected to the Legislative Assembly of Tonga at the 2014 Tongan general election, and appointed Deputy Prime Minister and Minister of Environment and Communications in the Cabinet of ʻAkilisi Pōhiva. As Communications Minister, he pushed through two bills allowing for internet censorship in 2015.

In September 2017, he was sacked for disloyalty for supporting King Tupou VI's decision to sack the Prime Minister, dissolve Parliament and call new elections. He ran in the 2017 Tongan general election and was re-elected as the only non-DPFI MP on Tongatapu. He subsequently contested the Premiership with Pohiva, but was defeated by 12 votes to 14.

Following the death of ʻAkilisi Pōhiva, Sovaleni supported Pōhiva Tuʻiʻonetoa for Prime Minister. He was appointed to Tuʻiʻonetoa's Cabinet as Minister for Education and Training.

In January 2021, he was bestowed with the chiefly title of Hu’akavameiliku, which had also been held by his father.

He was re-elected in the 2021 election while receiving the highest number of votes of all candidates for any seat.

Prime minister (2021–present)
In post-election negotiations he emerged as one of the two chief contenders for the Premiership, along with ʻAisake Eke. On 15 December 2021, he was elected Prime Minister, defeating Eke with 16 votes. Eke has stated that he will contest the election results in court. He was formally appointed Prime Minister on 27 December. He named his Cabinet on 29 December 2021, retaining the Education portfolio and in addition taking responsibility for Police and the Armed Forces.

On 12 March 2022 he tested positive for Covid-19.

References

External links 
 
 

|-

|-

|-

|-

|-

|-

|-

|-

|-

1970 births
Alumni of the University of Oxford
Deputy Prime Ministers of Tonga
Prime Ministers of Tonga
Education ministers of Tonga
Communication ministers of Tonga
Government ministers of Tonga
Defence Ministers of Tonga
Independent politicians in Tonga
Living people
Members of the Legislative Assembly of Tonga
People from Tongatapu
University of Auckland alumni
University of the South Pacific alumni
Tongan chiefs
Foreign ministers of Tonga